General elections were held in Ethiopia on 7 and 18 May 1995 for seats in its Council of People's Representatives; elections in the Afar, Somali, and Harari Regions were delayed until 28 June to assign experienced personnel who could solve possible conflicts and irregularities. This was the first regular multi-party election in Ethiopian history, and the first election since the adoption of a permanent constitution the previous December. Several opposition parties boycotted the election, including the All-Amhara People's Organization, Council of Alternative Forces for Peace and Democracy in Ethiopia, and Ethiopian Democratic Unity Party.

Background 
After President Mengistu Haile Mariam fled the country, a national conference in July 1991 led to the creation of the Transitional Government of Ethiopia (TGE). The TGE's main goal was to establish a Constitution for a federal republic, as well as create orderly elections for the legislative arm of that republic.  On 5 January 1995, the National Election Board of Ethiopia (NEBE) set the date for the general elections which would mark the end of the transition, for May of that year.

Observers considered it a foregone conclusion that the majority of the 547 seats in the House of People's Representatives would be won by the ruling coalition known as the Ethiopian People's Revolutionary Democratic Front (EPRDF), which had assumed power after overthrowing President Mengistu and had been the dominant force in the TGE. Primary opposition came from the small Ethiopian National Democratic Party, led by Nebiyu Samuel. Four of the seven national parties boycotted the poll, alleging unequal conditions for the various contending groups. Despite this, one source states as many as 2871 candidates competed for seats, although the NEBE reported 2741 candidates competed, consisting of 1881 people from 58 political organizations, mostly components of the EPRDF, and 960 independent candidates.

To handle the millions of citizens who came to cast their votes, 40,000 polling stations were opened. In addition to local observers Britain, the United States, Italy, France, Sweden, Belgium, Austria, the Netherlands, Spain, Canada, Finland, Norway, and Russia provided observers and the Organization of African Unity deployed 81 observers. The election process was reported to be peaceful with a high turnout in most polling stations throughout the country. Despite this impression of civil behavior, candidates of the Silte People's Democratic Unity Party were harassed, beaten, and prohibited from travelling; Dr. Asrat Woldeyes, secretary-general of the All-Amhara People's Organization, was arrested, convicted and sentenced to two years imprisonment for being at a meeting at which armed activities against the TGE were allegedly discussed; and officials of the Ethiopian Democratic Unity Party were arrested in Gondar and Bahir Dar.

Results
The EPRDF and its allies won 471 of the 547 seats in the Council, with other parties and independents taking the remaining 75 seats. Most of these seats won by other parties were in "frontier regions" – Afar, Somali, Gambela, Benishagul-Gumuz, and Harar – which were allocated 57 seats. "Competitions in these frontier regions tended to be extremely complicated," notes Lyon, who records such incidents as two brothers who, at one point, offered different candidate lists for the Afar Liberation Front.

References

Ethiopia
General election
General elections in Ethiopia
May 1995 events in Africa
Election and referendum articles with incomplete results